Dan Flavin is an American politician. He served as a Republican member for the 36th district of the Louisiana House of Representatives.

Flavin attended at the McNeese State University. He first worked as a real estate agent for which he attended and graduated at the Realtors Institute. In 1996, Flavin won the election for the 36th district of the Louisiana House of Representatives. He became a Republican member in 1997. Flavin succeeded politician, Randy Roach. In 2005, he was succeeded by Chuck Kleckley for the 36th district.

References 

Living people
Place of birth missing (living people)
Year of birth missing (living people)
Members of the Louisiana House of Representatives
Louisiana Democrats
Louisiana Republicans
20th-century American politicians
21st-century American politicians
McNeese State University alumni
American real estate brokers